Peter Dimitrovski (born 18 June 1995) is a Slovenian footballer who plays for Krka in the Slovenian PrvaLiga.

References

External links
PrvaLiga profile 

1995 births
Living people
Slovenian footballers
Association football defenders
NK Krka players